In mathematics, a generic polynomial refers usually to a polynomial whose coefficients are indeterminates.

However in Galois theory, a branch of algebra, and in this article, the term generic polynomial has a different, although related, meaning: a generic polynomial for a finite group G and a field F is a monic polynomial P with coefficients in the field of rational functions L = F(t1, ..., tn) in n indeterminates over F, such that the splitting field M of P has Galois group G over L, and such that every extension K/F with Galois group G can be obtained as the splitting field of a polynomial which is the specialization of P resulting from setting the n indeterminates to n elements of F. This is sometimes called F-generic or relative to the field F; a Q-generic polynomial, which is generic relative to the rational numbers is called simply generic.

The existence, and especially the construction, of a generic polynomial for a given Galois group provides a complete solution to the inverse Galois problem for that group. However, not all Galois groups have generic polynomials, a counterexample being the cyclic group of order eight.

Groups with generic polynomials

 The symmetric group Sn. This is trivial, as

is a generic polynomial for Sn.

 Cyclic groups Cn, where n is not divisible by eight. Lenstra showed that a cyclic group does not have a generic polynomial if n is divisible by eight, and G. W. Smith explicitly constructs such a polynomial in case n is not divisible by eight.
 The cyclic group construction leads to other classes of generic polynomials; in particular the dihedral group Dn has a generic polynomial if and only if n is not divisible by eight.
 The quaternion group Q8.
 Heisenberg groups  for any odd prime p.
 The alternating group A4.
 The alternating group A5.
 Reflection groups defined over Q, including in particular groups of the root systems for E6, E7, and E8.
 Any group which is a direct product of two groups both of which have generic polynomials.
 Any group which is a wreath product of two groups both of which have generic polynomials.

Examples of generic polynomials

Generic polynomials are known for all transitive groups of degree 5 or less.

Generic Dimension

The generic dimension for a finite group G over a field F, denoted , is defined as the minimal number of parameters in a generic polynomial for G over F, or  if no generic polynomial exists.

Examples:

Publications

Jensen, Christian U., Ledet, Arne, and Yui, Noriko, Generic Polynomials, Cambridge University Press, 2002

Field (mathematics)
Galois theory